Red Oak Creek may refer to:

Red Oak Creek (Georgia)
Red Oak Creek (Missouri)
Red Oak Creek (Trinity River), a stream in Texas
Red Oak Creek (West Virginia)